Neocollyris pseudocontracta is a species of ground beetle in the genus Neocollyris in the family Carabidae. It was described by Horn in 1937.

References

Pseudocontracta, Neocollyris
Beetles described in 1937